The Dronacharya Award, officially known as Dronacharya Award for Outstanding Coaches in Sports and Games, is sports coaching honour of the Republic of India. The award is named after Drona, often referred as "Dronacharya" or "Guru Drona", a character from the Sanskrit epic Mahabharata of ancient India. He was master of advanced military warfare and was appointed as the royal preceptor to the Kaurava and the Pandava princes for their training in military arts and astras (Divine weapons). It is awarded annually by the Ministry of Youth Affairs and Sports. Recipients are selected by a committee constituted by the Ministry and are honoured to have done "outstanding and meritorious work on a consistent basis and enabled sportspersons to excel in international events" over a period of four years. Two awards are designated for the lifetime contribution in coaching where the achievements in producing "outstanding sportspersons" over a period of 20 years or more are considered.

Instituted in 1985, the award is given only to the disciplines included in the events like Olympic Games, Paralympic Games, Asian Games, Commonwealth Games, World Championship and World Cup along with Cricket, Indigenous Games, and Parasports. The nominations for a given year are accepted till 30 April or last working day of April. A ten-member committee evaluates the nominations and later submits their recommendations to the Union Minister of Youth Affairs and Sports for further approval.

The first recipients of the award were Bhalchandra Bhaskar Bhagwat (Wrestling), Om Prakash Bhardwaj (Boxing), and O. M. Nambiar (Athletics), who were honoured in 1985. Usually conferred upon not more than five coaches in a year, a few exceptions have been made (2012 and 2016–2020) when more recipients were awarded in a year.

Nominations

The nominations for the award are received from all government recognised National Sports Federations, the Indian Olympic Association, the Sports Authority of India, the Sports Promotion and Control Boards, and the state and the union territory governments with not more than two eligible coaches nominated for each sports discipline. In case of cricket, the nominations are received from the Board of Control for Cricket in India as there is no National Sports Federation recognised by the Government. The Sports Authority of India (SAI) is authorised to submit the nominations on behalf of all the de-recognised or under suspension National Sports Federations. The previous award recipients of Major Dhyan Chand Khel Ratna, Arjuna Award, Dronacharya Award, and Dhyan Chand Award can also nominate one coach for the discipline for which they themselves were awarded. The Government can nominate up to two coaches in deserving cases where no such nominations have been received from the nominating authorities. The nominations for a given year are accepted till 30 April or last working day of April.

Selection process

All the received nominations are sent to SAI and concerned National Sports Federations for verification against the claimed achievements. The National Anti-Doping Agency is responsible for providing the doping clearance. Any coach associated with a sportsperson who is either penalised or being investigated for use of drugs or substances banned by the World Anti-Doping Agency is not eligible for the award along with the previous award recipients of Dhyan Chand Award. A committee consisting of the Joint Secretary and the Director/Deputy Secretary of Department of Sports, the Secretary and the Executive Director/Director (TEAMS) of SAI verify and validate the nominations.

The valid nominations are considered by a selection committee constituted by the Government. This eleven members committee consists of a Chairperson nominated by the Ministry, two members who are either Olympians or previous recipients of the Major Dhyan Chand Khel Ratna or the Arjuna Award, three previous recipients of the Dronacharya Award of different sports disciplines, two sports journalists/experts/commentators, one sports administrator, the Director General of SAI, and the Joint Secretary of Department of Sports, with not more than one sportsperson from any particular discipline being included in the committee. The medals won in various International championships and events in disciplines included in Summer and Winter Olympic and Paralympics Games, Asian Games, and Commonwealth Games are given 80% weightage. The remaining 20% weightage is given to the profile and standard of the events where their trainees have won the medals. For any other games not included in Olympic, Asian Games, and Commonwealth Games like cricket and indigenous games, individual performances are taken into consideration. Coach with maximum points is given 80 marks, while the remaining coaches are given marks in proportion to the maximum points. For team events, marks are given per the strength of the team. Following are the points defined for medals at the given events:

For a given discipline, not more than two coaches, one male and one female, are given highest marks. The committee may not recommend the award to the coach with the highest marks across disciplines but can only recommend the recipient of the highest aggregate marks in a particular sports discipline. The recommendations of the selection committee are submitted to the Ministry of Youth Affairs and Sports for further approval.

Recipients

Controversies

Some of the recipients have been accused of falsely claiming the achievements of the medalist under their names. Satpal Singh (2009), Ramphal (2011), and Yashvir Singh (2012) had mentioned two times Olympic medal winning wrestler Sushil Kumar (2008 and 2012) as their trainee. The award for year 2012 was bestowed upon para sports athletics coach Satyapal Singh. However, 2010 Arjuna Award winning para athlete Jagseer Singh accused Satyapal Singh for falsely mentioning him as their trainee for the award. Jagseer Singh mentioned that 2006 Dronacharya Award winner R. D. Singh was appointed as the main coach and Satyapal Singh was an assisting coach. Jagseer was informed about such claim via Right to Information Act, 2005 which had him mentioned as the primary trainee by Satyapal Singh. 2013 award winner Raj Singh also claimed Sushil Kumar and 2012 Summer Olympics medal winning wrestler Yogeshwar Dutt as their trainee. Following an announcement, in August 2015, a Public-Interest Litigation was filed in the Delhi High Court by Vinod Kumar. The petitioner, former chief wrestling coach, mentioned that he was the chief national coach of men's freestyle wrestling team from November 2010 to April 2015 and claimed that he had more points (420) than the recipient Anoop Singh Dahiya (375). The court directed the Ministry to confer the award on Kumar and provided one week to the Ministry to challenge the decision. However, the Ministry did not change their decision as the Wrestling Federation of India (WFI) had sacked Kumar in May 2015.

Explanatory notes

References

External links

 

Civil awards and decorations of India
Recipients of the Dronacharya Award
Indian sports coaches
Indian sports trophies and awards
Awards established in 1985
India sport-related lists
Ministry of Youth Affairs and Sports
1985 establishments in India